Thomas Meilstrup also known as just Thomas (born in Denmark on 23 January 1998) is a Danish singer, musician and actor.

He was in Eventyrteatret (Adventure Theatre) where he took lessons in acting, dancing and singing. He was invited to sing in the Stig Rossens Christmas special, also singing at various festivals. He also plays the piano and keyboard, usually both playing while singing during his performances. 

In 2008 he played the role of Læris in the film Frode og alle de andre rødder directed by Bubber. He has also sung for cartoon series like Tordenguden Thor, in the film Far til fire på japansk, and memorably in Happy Feet Two, where he sings with the voice of the little penguin character. He also voiced the character Steven Universe in the Danish dub during the last episode of the series Steven Universe as well as Steven Universe: The Movie and Steven Universe Future.

Winner of Skjulte stjerner
In 2011, he was selected by Tim Schou, the lead singer of the Danish band A Friend in London as a potential "star" that participated in the inaugural season of Skjulte stjerner (meaning "Hidden Star"). Tim Schou would mentor Thomas throughout the 8 weeks of the show from 2 September to 14 October 2010 and make various duets with him.

Thomas with his mentor partner Tim Schou won the show in the final against runners-up Mie mentored and coupled with Karen and third Emily mentored and coupled with U$O.

Thomas went on to win 250,000 Danish kroners and just after the program released his debut official song "Almost There" featuring Tim Schou.

Personal life
Thomas Meilstrup is the son of Dansk Melodi Grand Prix star Gry Meilstrup (also known as Gry Johansen).

Discography

Albums

Singles
2011: "Almost There" (featuring Tim Schou)

Filmography

Live action 
2008: Frode og alle de andre rødder - Læris

Animation 

 2021: Steven Universe - Steven Universe
 2021: Steven Universe: The Movie - Steven Universe
 2022: Steven Universe Future - Steven Universe
 2022: Dead End: Paranormal Park - Barney Guttman (singing voice)

References

External links

Danish male film actors
1998 births
Living people
21st-century Danish  male singers